The 1958 FIFA World Cup was the sixth FIFA World Cup, a quadrennial football tournament for men's senior national teams, and was played in Sweden from 8 to 29 June 1958. It was the first FIFA World Cup to be played in a Nordic country.

Brazil beat Sweden 5–2 in the final in Solna, Stockholm, to claim their first title, having beaten France in the semi final and Wales in the quarter final. The tournament also marked the arrival of a then 17-year-old Pelé on the world stage, who scored in all three of Brazil's knockout games.

This was the first appearance of Wales at the FIFA World Cup and they would not qualify for another until 64 years later. This tournament also marked the debuts of fellow British side Northern Ireland, as well as the Soviet Union.

Host selection 

Argentina, Chile, Mexico, and Sweden expressed interest in hosting the tournament. Swedish delegates lobbied other countries at the FIFA Congress held in Rio de Janeiro around the opening of the 1950 World Cup finals. Sweden was awarded the 1958 tournament unopposed on 23 June 1950.

Qualification 

The hosts (Sweden) and the defending champions (West Germany) qualified automatically. Of the remaining 14 places, nine were allocated to Europe, three to South America, one to North/Central America, and one to Asia/Africa.

Aside from the main European zone matches, Wales, which finished second in its group behind Czechoslovakia, was drawn into a play-off with Israel after Israel won its group by default because its three opponents, Turkey, Indonesia and Sudan, refused to play. FIFA had imposed a rule that no team would qualify without playing at least one match, something that had happened in several previous World Cups. Wales won the play-off and qualified for the first time. With Northern Ireland making its debut, and England and Scotland also qualifying, this World Cup was the only one to date to feature all four of the United Kingdom's Home Nations.

This World Cup also saw the entry and qualification of the Soviet Union for the first time, while Argentina appeared for the first time since 1934.  It was also the first one for which Italy failed to qualify (Italy did not take part in the 1930 tournament but there was no qualification for that competition). Other teams that failed to qualify included two-time champions and 1954 semifinalists Uruguay, as well as Spain and Belgium.

On 8 February 1958, in Solna, Lennart Hyland and Sven Jerring presented the results of the draw where the qualified teams were divided into four groups. Seeding was geographical rather than by team strength, with each group containing one western European team, one eastern European team, one of the four British teams that had qualified, and one from the Americas.

List of qualified teams

The following 16 teams qualified for the final tournament.

AFC (0)
 None qualified
CAF (0)
 None qualified

NAFC (1)
 
CCCF (0)
 None qualified
CONMEBOL (3)
 
 
 

UEFA (12)
 
 
 
 
 
 
 
  
  (hosts)
 
  (title holders)

Format 

The format of the competition changed from 1954: 16 teams still competed in four groups of four, but this time each team played each of the other teams in its group at least once, without extra time in the event of a draw. Two points were awarded for a win and one point for a draw. If the first two teams finished on equal points then goal average would decide who was placed first and second. As in 1954, if the second and third placed teams finished on the same points, then there would be a play-off with the winner going through. If a play-off resulted in a draw, goal average from the group games would be used to determine who went through to the next round. If the goal averages were equal then lots would have been drawn. These arrangements had not been finalised by the time the tournament started and were still being debated as it progressed. Some teams complained that a play-off match, meaning three games in five days, was too much, and before the second round of group matches FIFA informed the teams that goal average would be used before resorting to a play-off. This was overturned when the Swedish Football Association complained, stating that it was wrong to change the rules mid-tournament, but also because it wanted the extra revenue from playoff matches.

This was the first time that goal average was available to separate teams in a World Cup. It was used to separate the teams finishing first and second in one of the groups. However, all three playoffs finished with decisive results and so it was not needed to separate the teams involved in a tied playoff.

Almost all the matches kicked off simultaneously in each of the three rounds of the group phase, as did the quarter-finals and semi-finals. The exceptions were Sweden's three group matches, all of which were televised by Sveriges Radio; these started at other times so Swedes could attend other matches without missing their own team's. Apart from these, one match per round was televised, and relayed across Europe by the European Broadcasting Union (EBU). Many Swedes bought their first television for the World Cup.

The official ball was the "Top-Star VMbollen 1958" model made by Sydsvenska Läder & Remfabriks AB (aka "Remmen" or "Sydläder") in Ängelholm. It was chosen from 102 candidates in a blind test by four FIFA officials.

Summary 

In Group 4, Pelé and Garrincha did not play until the last of Brazil's group games, against the Soviet Union. Pelé failed to score, but provided the assist to Vavá's second goal. Brazil won the game 2–0 (also thanks to an impressive exhibition of dribbling prowess by Garrincha) and the group by two points. Previously, they had drawn 0–0 with England in what was the first ever goalless game in World Cup history. Eventually, the Soviet Union and England went to a playoff game, in which Anatoli Ilyin scored in the 67th minute to knock England out, while Austria had already been eliminated. The English side had been weakened by the Munich air disaster earlier in the year, which killed three internationals on the books of Manchester United, including England's young star Duncan Edwards.

Playoffs were also needed in Group 1 (Northern Ireland beat Czechoslovakia to join the defending champions West Germany in the quarter-finals) and Group 3 (Wales topped Hungary to advance with hosts Sweden). Hungary had become a spent force after their appearance in the final of the previous tournament. They had lost their best players two years before, when they fled in the wake of the failed uprising against the communist regime. In a rather restrictive sense, from the 1954 team, only goalkeeper Gyula Grosics, defender Jozsef Bozsik and forward Nándor Hidegkuti remained.

In Group 2, Scotland faced Yugoslavia, Paraguay, and France. France topped the group, with Just Fontaine netting six goals. Yugoslavia finished second, while Scotland came in last.

The quarter-finals saw France's Just Fontaine continue in similar form as in the group stage, managing another two goals as France triumphed over Northern Ireland. West Germany's Helmut Rahn put them into the semi-finals with a single goal against Yugoslavia, while Sweden went through at the expense of USSR. The other game in the quarter-finals saw Pelé score the only goal for Brazil against Wales.

In the semi-finals, Sweden continued their strong run as they defeated West Germany 3–1 in a vicious game that saw the German player Erich Juskowiak sent off (the first ever German player to be sent off in an international game) and German veteran forward Fritz Walter injured, which further weakened the German team (substitutes were first allowed in the 1970 FIFA World Cup).

In the other semi-final, Brazil and France were tied 1–1 for much of the first half. However, 36 minutes into the game French captain and most experienced defender Robert Jonquet suffered broken leg in a clash with Vavá, and France was down to ten men for the rest of the game (substitutions were not allowed back then). Brazil dominated the rest of the match, as a Pelé hat-trick gave them a 5–2 victory. Fontaine of France added one goal to his impressive tally.

The third place match saw Fontaine score four more goals as France defeated West Germany 6–3. This brought his total to 13 goals in one competition, a record that still stands.

Final 
The final was played in Solna, in the Råsunda Stadium; 50,000 people watched as the Brazilians went a goal down after four minutes. However Vavá equalised shortly afterwards and then put them a goal ahead before half time. In the second half, Pelé outshone everyone, notching two goals, including the first one where he lobbed the ball over Bengt Gustavsson then followed it with a precise volley shot. Zagallo added a goal in between, and Sweden managed a consolation goal.

The Final saw many records made in World Cup history that still stand . At age 17, Pelé simultaneously became the youngest player to participate in, score, and win a World Cup final. Conversely, Nils Liedholm became the oldest player to score in a World Cup Final at 35 years 263 days. This final had the highest number of goals scored by a winning team (5), the highest number of total goals scored (7), and together with the 1970 and 1998 finals shares the highest goal margin of difference (3); Brazil played in all those three finals.

The game is also notable for many firsts in FIFA World Cup. With the exception of the 1950 FIFA World Cup final group stage, this marked the first time that a World Cup host reached the final without winning it. Additionally, the match marked the first time two nations from different continents (Europe and South America) met in a World Cup final. It also marks the first and only World Cup hosted in Europe not won by a European team; a feat mirrored in 2014 where a World Cup hosted in the Americas was not won by a team from the Americas for the first time, with Germany beating Argentina 1–0 at the final.

Venues 
A total of twelve cities throughout the central and southern parts of Sweden hosted the tournament. FIFA regulations required at least six stadiums to have a capacity of at least 20,000. If Denmark had qualified, the organisers had planned to use the Idrætsparken in Copenhagen for Denmark's group matches. The Idrætsparken was renovated in 1956 with this in mind, but Denmark lost out to England in qualification. When doubts arose about whether funding would be forthcoming for rebuilding the Ullevi and Malmö Stadion, the organisers considered stadiums in Copenhagen and Oslo as contingency measures.

The Råsunda Stadium was expanded from 38,000 for the World Cup by building end stands. Organising committee chairman Holger Bergérus mortgaged his house to pay for this. The new Malmö Stadion was built for the World Cup, replacing the 1896 Malmö Stadion at a new site. The Idrottsparken had 4,709 seats added for the World Cup. The Social Democratic municipal government refused to pay for this until the organisers threatened to select Folkungavallen in Linköping instead. At the Rimnersvallen, a stand from the smaller Oddevallen stadium was moved to Rimnersvallen for the World Cup. The crowd at Brazil v. Austria was estimated at 21,000, with more looking in from the adjoining hillside. The most used stadium was the Råsunda Stadium in Stockholm, which hosted 8 matches including the final, followed by the Ullevi Stadium in Gothenburg (the biggest stadium used during the tournament), which hosted 7 matches. The Malmö Stadium hosted 4 matches, Norrköping hosted 3 matches; Borås, Halmstad, Helsingborg, Västerås and Sandviken hosted 2 matches each and Örebro, Eskilstuna and Uddevalla each hosted 1 match.

Match officials 

22 match officials were assigned to the tournament to serve as referees and assistant referees.

Europe
  Fritz Seipelt
  Lucien van Nuffel
  Martin Macko
  Carl Jørgensen
  Arthur Ellis
  Reginald Leafe
  Arne Eriksson
  Maurice Guigue
  István Zsolt
  Vincenzo Orlandini
  Jan Bronkhorst
  Joaquim Campos
  Jack Mowat
  Juan Gardeazábal Garay
  Sten Ahlner
  Raymond Wyssling
  Nikolai Latyshev
  Mervyn Griffiths
  Albert Dusch
  Leo Lemešić

South America
  Juan Brozzi
  José María Codesal

Seeding 
There was no seeding for this World Cup; the teams were instead allocated geographically into four pots chosen by the FIFA Organising Committee. Teams were drawn from each pot into Groups 1–4 in numerical order.

Preventing the defending champions from meeting the hosts in the group stage, either by seeding or predetermined group positions, was a practiced tradition throughout the history of the FIFA World Cup, with 1934 and 1954 being the only two exceptions. This tradition continued in 1958, with West Germany as defending champion and host nation Sweden both being allocated into the same Western European Pot, which kept them from meeting in the group stage.

The geographical basis of the seeding attracted criticism, especially from Austria, who were drawn against the teams considered strongest in each of the other three pots.

Squads 
For a list of all squads that appeared in the final tournament, see 1958 FIFA World Cup squads.

Group stage

Group 1

The West Germans, surprise world champions four years before, were still very strong, and fielded an exciting young forward in Uwe Seeler. The Germans had to contend with a real powerhouse in Argentina's team, competing for the first time since 1934. In fact, some experts thought Argentina had a very realistic chance of reaching the semi finals or even winning the World Cup this time.
Czechoslovakia was a fairly strong team with a rich football tradition, and was considered to be no walkover for the West Germans or the Argentinians. 

Nobody expected much from tiny newcomers Northern Ireland. But the Northern Irish had already shown that they could be a danger by knocking out double world champions Italy in World Cup qualifying.
In the end, the Northern Irish pulled off one of the biggest upsets in World Cup Finals history by qualifying for the quarter-finals, beating Czechoslovakia in a play-off. 

Argentina experienced a horrible blow finishing last in the group with a −5 goal differential. Arriving home, the Argentinian team met the wrath of several thousand angry football fans at Ezeiza Airport in Buenos Aires.

 Northern Ireland finished ahead of Czechoslovakia by winning a play-off

Play-off

Group 2

The second group saw the largest number of goals scored in a single group in the 1958 World Cup with 31 goals in total (~5.16 goals per game). Just Fontaine of France scored 6 of his 13 goals in the tournament, making him the tournament's top scorer going into the quarter-finals.

None of the teams in this group had been particularly successful at previous World Cups. France, despite having hosted the 1938 event, had not achieved any real World Cup success, Yugoslavia had not been able to replicate their semi-final success of 1930 and Paraguay and Scotland were considered underdogs during the tournament.

France won the group ahead of Yugoslavia and would go on to finish third.

 France finished ahead of Yugoslavia on goal average

Group 3

The Swedish hosts could count themselves lucky in ending up in a rather weak group which they proceeded to win fairly easily with their powerful workmanlike football. The group included Hungary which had been considered by far the best team in the world some years ago – although the Hungarians could not beat West Germany in the final of the World Cup in 1954. But the Hungarian team had been dealt a blow by the Hungarian Revolution of 1956 after which star players like Sándor Kocsis and Ferenc Puskás left their homeland. Striker Nándor Hidegkuti was still playing, but he was by now 36 years old and nowhere near his previous form.

In spite of Hungary's recent travails, they were still considered a strong side and were expected to advance from their group. The success of Wales was a surprise but they drew all their group games and beat the Hungarians in a play-off match to follow Sweden into the knock-out stage. Wales played Brazil in the quarterfinals and became the recipient of young Pelé's first World Cup goal.

The 1–1 draw between Wales and Mexico was the first point scored by Mexico in a World Cup, having lost all eight matches in their previous three appearances in the World Cup, as well as their first match in this group against Sweden. To date, no other team has ever lost nine consecutive games in the World Cup.

The match between Hungary and Wales in Sandviken became the northernmost World Cup match in history.

 Wales finished ahead of Hungary by winning a play-off

Play-off

Group 4

Despite the disappointments of the previous tournaments, Brazil were considered extremely powerful, as would prove to be the case. The Soviet Union were the reigning Olympic champion and Austria had won the bronze medal in the 1954 World Cup in Switzerland, four years earlier. And although England, weakened by the loss of several players at the Munich air disaster, were not considered at their very best, they were still always a formidable team.

In the end, this group had the highest average attendance (31,320 per game), even higher than Group 3 with the host nation, Sweden.

The quality of the football in this group did not quite live up to expectations, however. Only 15 goals were scored in the whole group, only one more than Group 3. And when England and Brazil drew 0–0, it was the first time in World Cup history that a game ended goalless. It was also the first time Brazil had failed to score in a World Cup finals match.

Brazil won the group without conceding a single goal. The teenage Pelé played Brazil's last game against the Soviet Union. He did not score but drew wild reviews for his play. The Soviet Union, in their first World Cup, took second place.

 The Soviet Union finished ahead of England by winning a play-off

Play-off

Knockout stage

Bracket

Quarter-finals

Semi-finals

Third place play-off

Final

Goalscorers
With 13 goals, Just Fontaine was the top scorer in the tournament. , no player has ever scored more goals in a single FIFA World Cup Final stage. In total, 126 goals were scored by 60 players, with none of them credited as an own goal.

13 goals
  Just Fontaine

6 goals
  Pelé
  Helmut Rahn

5 goals
  Vavá
  Peter McParland

4 goals
  Zdeněk Zikán
  Lajos Tichy
  Kurt Hamrin
  Agne Simonsson

3 goals
  Omar Oreste Corbatta
  Raymond Kopa
  Roger Piantoni
  Hans Schäfer
  Todor Veselinović

2 goals

  José Altafini
  Milan Dvořák
  Václav Hovorka
  Derek Kevan
  Maryan Wisnieski
  Juan Bautista Agüero
  Florencio Amarilla
  José Parodi
  Jorge Lino Romero
  Anatoli Ilyin
  Nils Liedholm
  Ivor Allchurch
  Uwe Seeler
  Aleksandar Petaković

1 goal

  Ludovico Avio
  Norberto Menéndez
  Karl Koller
  Alfred Körner
  Didi
  Nílton Santos
  Mário Zagallo
  Jiří Feureisl
  Tom Finney
  Johnny Haynes
  Yvon Douis
  Jean Vincent
  József Bencsics
  József Bozsik
  Károly Sándor
  Jaime Belmonte
  Wilbur Cush
  Cayetano Ré
  Sammy Baird
  Bobby Collins
  Jackie Mudie
  Jimmy Murray
  Aleksandr Ivanov
  Valentin Ivanov
  Nikita Simonyan
  Gunnar Gren
  Lennart Skoglund
  John Charles
  Terry Medwin
  Hans Cieslarczyk
  Radivoje Ognjanović
  Zdravko Rajkov

All-Star Team 
The team of the tournament voted by journalists was as follows: 

 Goalkeeper: Harry Gregg
 Defenders: Orvar Bergmark, Hilderaldo Bellini, Nílton Santos
 Midfielders: Yuriy Voynov, Didi, Horst Szymaniak
 Forwards: Garrincha, Just Fontaine, Pelé, Lennart Skoglund

Although Just Fontaine got more votes than any other forward, they were split between the left and right inside forward positions. The All-Star Team scored 12 goals in total. Fontaine scored 13.

FIFA retrospective ranking 

In 1986, FIFA published a report that ranked all teams in each World Cup up to and including 1986, based on progress in the competition, overall results and quality of the opposition. The rankings for the 1958 tournament were as follows:

In popular culture 
The 1958 FIFA World Cup is depicted in the 2016 American film Pelé: Birth of a Legend which is centered around Pelé and the Brazilian team's journey to winning the tournament.

See also 

 Conspiracy 58, a mockumentary conspiracy theory film claiming the 1958 World Cup never happened.

References

Citations

External links

1958 FIFA World Cup Sweden , FIFA.com
Details at RSSSF

 
FIFA World Cup tournaments
International association football competitions hosted by Sweden
World Cup
World Cup
FIFA World Cup
International sports competitions in Malmö
International sports competitions in Gothenburg
FIFA World Cup
FIFA World Cup
Sports competitions in Sandviken
Sports competitions in Uddevalla
Sports competitions in Eskilstuna
Sports competitions in Västerås
Sports competitions in Norrköping
Sports competitions in Borås
Sports competitions in Örebro